George Croghan (1720–1782) was an Irish-American colonist, fur trader, and land speculator.

George Croghan may also refer to:

George Croghan (soldier) (1791–1849), American soldier in the War of 1812 and the Mexican–American War

See also
George Croghan Reid, soldier